"The Bathers", or in French "Les Baigneuses", can refer to the following artworks:
 
 Bathers at Asnières, a painting by Georges Seurat in 1883
 Les Grandes Baigneuses (Renoir), by Pierre-Auguste Renoir in 1887
 The Bathers (Renoir), another painting by Pierre-Auguste Renoir in 1918–1919
 A painting by Paul Gauguin in 1898
 The Bathers (Cézanne), by Paul Cézanne, who has a number of paintings with this title
 Les Baigneuses (Gleizes), a painting by Albert Gleizes
 Baigneuses (Metzinger), a painting by Jean Metzinger
 The Bathers, a painting by Australian artist Lionel Jago in 1950

Other uses
 The Bathers (band), a Scottish band